Punjab Assembly may refer to:

 Provincial Assembly of the Punjab, the unicameral legislature in Lahore, Pakistan
 Punjab Legislative Assembly, the unicameral legislature of the state of Punjab, northern India 
 Punjab Legislative Assembly (British India), the legislature of the province of Punjab in British India, established by British authorities in 1910